Yongdingmenwai Subdistrict is a subdistrict in the southern part of Dongcheng District, Beijing, China. By the year 2020, it has a population of 64,790.

The subdistrict got its name from Yongdingmen, a former front gate on the Beijing city wall.

History

Administrative Division 
As of 2021, There are a total of 19 communities within the subdistrict:

Landmarks 

 Yongdingmen

External links 
 Official website (Archived)

References 

Dongcheng District, Beijing
Subdistricts of Beijing